William Allen Woods (May 16, 1837 – June 29, 1901) was a United States circuit judge of the United States Court of Appeals for the Seventh Circuit and of the United States Circuit Courts for the Seventh Circuit.

Education and career

Born on May 16, 1837, near Farmington, Tennessee, Woods received an Artium Baccalaureus degree from Wabash College in 1859 and read law to enter the bar in 1861. He was in private practice in Goshen, Indiana from 1862 to 1867. He was a member of the Indiana House of Representatives from 1867 to 1869, returning to private practice in Goshen from 1870 to 1873. He was a judge of the 34th Judicial District of Indiana from 1874 to 1880, and then a justice of the Indiana Supreme Court from 1881 to 1883.

Federal judicial service

Woods received a recess appointment from President Chester A. Arthur on May 2, 1883, to a seat on the United States District Court for the District of Indiana vacated by Judge Walter Q. Gresham. He was nominated to the same position by President Arthur on December 18, 1883. He was confirmed by the United States Senate on January 7, 1884, and received his commission the same day. His service terminated on March 21, 1892, due to his elevation to the Seventh Circuit.

Woods was nominated by President Benjamin Harrison on December 16, 1891, to the United States Court of Appeals for the Seventh Circuit and the United States Circuit Courts for the Seventh Circuit, to a new joint seat authorized by 26 Stat. 826. He was confirmed by the Senate on March 17, 1892, and received his commission the same day. His service terminated on June 29, 1901, due to his death in Indianapolis, Indiana.

Family

Woods was the father of painter and writer Alice Woods Ullman.

References

Sources
 

1837 births
1901 deaths
Wabash College alumni
Members of the Indiana House of Representatives
Indiana state court judges
Justices of the Indiana Supreme Court
Judges of the United States District Court for the District of Indiana
United States federal judges appointed by Chester A. Arthur
Judges of the United States Court of Appeals for the Seventh Circuit
United States federal judges appointed by Benjamin Harrison
19th-century American judges
United States federal judges admitted to the practice of law by reading law
19th-century American politicians
19th-century American lawyers